Steve Crosby is a British record producer, songwriter and music manager. He is best known for creating the group Steps.

Crosby started his career DJing at the age of 17 and, from there, he bought and ran a record shop. Crosby then moved into corporate entertainment and it was not long before he turned his hand to developing and managing bands. His best-known acts are pop sensation Steps. Crosby wrote songs for Steps such as "5,6,7,8". He also co-wrote Fast Food Rockers' "The Fast Food Song" with Mike Stock and Sandy Rass. Crosby also co-wrote "That Sounds Good to Me" (which was the British entry for the 2010 Eurovision Song Contest) with Pete Waterman and Mike Stock, performed by Josh Dubovie. Crosby also managed Italian artist Patrizio Buanne, who had a triple platinum selling CD under his tenure.
In 2008 he joined forces again with Mike Stock to create and produce The Go!Go!Go! Show, which has toured the UK, played in London's West End and was the featured live music entertainment at Alton Towers Resort during the 2011 season.

References
 BBC Coverage of Eurovision Entry

Living people
British music managers
British songwriters
British record producers
Year of birth missing (living people)